Club Patín Tenerife was a Spanish rink hockey club from Santa Cruz de Tenerife, Canary Islands.

History
Founded in 1970, Tenerife promoted for the first time to the first division in 1982, but was immediately relegated in the next season. Fifteen years later, it promoted again to the top tier, where they remained until 2011.

In 2008, Tenerife conquered the CERS Cup and made the debut in the next season of the European League.

Three years later, the club relegated to Primera División but did not join the competition as it was dissolved due to the financial trouble.

Season to season

Men's team

Trophies
CERS Cup: 1
2008

References

External links
Club official blog 

Sports clubs established in 1970
Sports clubs disestablished in 2011
Spanish rink hockey clubs
Sport in Tenerife
Sports teams in the Canary Islands